Linycus exhortator is a species of insect belonging to the family Ichneumonidae.

It is native to Europe and Northern America.

References

Ichneumonidae